Blue Point was a station stop along the Montauk Branch of the Long Island Rail Road It was located on Martha Avenue on the south side of the tracks in Blue Point, New York, and was the westernmost station along the Montauk Branch in the Town of Brookhaven. Access to the station was through a driveway that emptied onto Blue Point Avenue. The station was originally opened on February 1, 1870, by the South Side Railroad of Long Island and closed on June 1, 1882. The second depot opened around June, 1900, evidently in conjunction with the bridge over Blue Point Avenue. The newer station also had a connection to the South Shore Traction Company trolleys, which were later replaced by Suffolk Traction Company trolleys. Blue Point station closed on September 6, 1980. It was located between Bayport and Patchogue stations, the former of which also closed on the same day. It was located between Bayport and Patchogue stations. The former station site, across from the Blue Point Wine & Liquor store, remains, to this day, gated off, and covered partially in trees, leaves, and weeds.

References

External links
Blue Point SSRRLI Station image (Arrt's Arrchives)
1910 Station House (Unofficial LIRR History Website)
Blue Point overall station history (TrainsAreFun)

Former Long Island Rail Road stations in Suffolk County, New York
Railway stations in the United States opened in 1870
Railway stations closed in 1980
1870 establishments in New York (state)
1980 disestablishments in New York (state)
Demolished railway stations in the United States